Re:Zero − Starting Life in Another World is an anime adaptation of a light novel series written by Tappei Nagatsuki and illustrated by Shinichirou Otsuka. On March 23, 2019, it was announced that a second season was in production. The cast and staff reprised their roles for the second season. It was scheduled to premiere in April 2020, but was delayed to July 2020 due to production complications caused by the COVID-19 pandemic. The season is split into two halves, with the first half premiering on July 8, 2020, and the second half premiering on January 6, 2021. For episodes 1–13, the opening theme is "Realize" by Konomi Suzuki while the ending theme is "Memento" by nonoc. For episodes 14–25, the opening theme is "Long shot" by Mayu Maeshima while the ending theme is "Believe in you" by nonoc.


Episode list

Notes

References

External links
  
 
 

Re:Zero - Starting Life in Another World episode lists
2020 Japanese television seasons
2021 Japanese television seasons
Anime postponed due to the COVID-19 pandemic